Min (BUC: Mìng-ngṳ̄) is a broad group of Sinitic languages spoken by about 30 million people in Fujian province as well as by the descendants of Min speaking colonists on Leizhou peninsula and Hainan, or assimilated natives of Chaoshan, parts of Zhongshan, three counties in southern Wenzhou, Zhoushan archipelago, Taiwan, and Singapore. The name is derived from the Min River in Fujian, which is also the abbreviated name of Fujian Province. Min varieties are not mutually intelligible with one another nor with any other variety of Chinese (such as Mandarin, Cantonese, Wu, Gan, Xiang, or Hakka).

There are many Min speakers among overseas Chinese in Southeast Asia. The most widely spoken variety of Min outside of mainland China is Hokkien, a variety of Southern Min which has its origin in southern Fujian. Amoy Hokkien is the prestige dialect of Hokkien in Fujian, while a majority of Taiwanese speak a dialect called Taiwanese Hokkien or simply Taiwanese. The majority of Chinese Singaporeans are of Southern Min-speaking background (particularly Hokkien and Teochew), although the rise of Mandarin as a home language in that country has led to a decline in the use of Min Chinese. Communities speaking Eastern Min and Pu-Xian Min can also be found in parts of the Chinese diaspora.

Many Min languages have retained notable features of the Old Chinese language, and there is linguistic evidence that not all Min varieties are directly descended from Middle Chinese of the Sui–Tang dynasties. Min languages are believed to have a significant linguistic substrate from the languages of the inhabitants of the region prior to its sinicization.

History
The Min homeland of Fujian was opened to Han Chinese settlement by the defeat of the Minyue state by the armies of Emperor Wu of Han in 110 BC.
The area features rugged mountainous terrain, with short rivers that flow into the South China Sea.
Most subsequent migration from north to south China passed through the valleys of the Xiang and Gan rivers to the west, so that Min varieties have experienced less northern influence than other southern groups.
As a result, whereas most varieties of Chinese can be treated as derived from Middle Chinese—the language described by rhyme dictionaries such as the Qieyun (601 AD)—Min varieties contain traces of older distinctions.
Linguists estimate that the oldest layers of Min dialects diverged from the rest of Chinese around the time of the Han dynasty.
However, significant waves of migration from the North China Plain occurred:
 The Uprising of the Five Barbarians during the Jin dynasty, particularly the Disaster of Yongjia in 311 AD, caused a tide of immigration to the south.
 In 669, Chen Zheng and his son Chen Yuanguang from Gushi County in Henan set up a regional administration in Fujian to suppress an insurrection by the She people.
 Wang Chao was appointed governor of Fujian in 893, near the end of the Tang dynasty, and brought tens of thousands of troops from Henan. In 909, following the fall of the Tang dynasty, his son Wang Shenzhi founded the Min Kingdom, one of the Ten Kingdoms in the Five Dynasties and Ten Kingdoms period.
Jerry Norman identifies four main layers in the vocabulary of modern Min varieties:
 A non-Chinese substratum from the original languages of Minyue, which Norman and Mei Tsu-lin believe were Austroasiatic.
 The earliest Chinese layer, brought to Fujian by settlers from Zhejiang to the north during the Han dynasty.
 A layer from the Northern and Southern dynasties period, which is largely consistent with the phonology of the Qieyun dictionary.
 A literary layer based on the koiné of Chang'an, the capital of the Tang dynasty.
Laurent Sagart (2008) disagrees with Norman and Mei Tsu-lin's analysis of an Austroasiatic substratum in Min. The hypothesis proposed by Jerry Norman and Tsu-Lin Mei arguing for an Austroasiatic homeland along the middle Yangtze has been largely abandoned in most circles, and left unsupported by the majority of Austroasiatic specialists. Rather, recent movements of analyzing archeological evidence, posit an Austronesian layer, rather than an Austroasiatic one.

Geographic location and subgrouping

Min is usually described as one of seven or ten groups of varieties of Chinese but has greater dialectal diversity than any of the other groups. The varieties used in neighbouring counties, and in the mountains of western Fujian even in adjacent villages, are often mutually unintelligible.

Early classifications, such as those of Li Fang-Kuei in 1937 and Yuan Jiahua in 1960, divided Min into Northern and Southern subgroups.
However, in a 1963 report on a survey of Fujian, Pan Maoding and colleagues argued that the primary split was between inland and coastal groups. Norman reconstructs these initials in Proto-Min as voiceless and voiced laterals that merged in coastal varieties.

Coastal Min
The coastal varieties have the vast majority of speakers, and have spread from their homeland in Fujian and eastern Guangdong to the islands of Taiwan and Hainan, to other coastal areas of southern China and to Southeast Asia.
Pan and colleagues divided them into three groups:
 Eastern Min (Min Dong), centered around the city of Fuzhou, the capital of Fujian province, with Fuzhou dialect as the prestige form.
 Pu-Xian Min is spoken in the city of Putian and the county of Xianyou County. Li Rulong and Chen Zhangtai examined 214 words, finding 62% shared with Quanzhou dialect (Southern Min) and 39% shared with Fuzhou dialect (Eastern Min), and concluded that Pu-Xian was more closely related to Southern Min.
 Southern Min (Min Nan) originates from the south of Fujian and the eastern corner of Guangdong. In popular usage, Southern Min usually refers to dialects of the Quanzhang type, which originated in southern Fujian (around Quanzhou, Zhangzhou and Xiamen) and spread to Southeast Asia, where they are known as Hokkien, and Taiwan, where they are known as Taiwanese. Zhenan Min of Cangnan County in southern Zhejiang is also of this type. The dialects of the Chaoshan region of eastern Guangdong, including Teochew and Shantou dialects, have difficult mutual intelligibility with the Amoy dialect. Teochew varieties are the most often spoken by Thai Chinese.
The Language Atlas of China (1987) distinguished two further groups, which had previously been included in Southern Min:
 Leizhou Min, spoken on the Leizhou Peninsula in southwestern Guangdong.
 Hainanese, spoken on the island of Hainan. These dialects feature drastic changes to initial consonants, including a series of implosive consonants, that have been attributed to contact with the Tai–Kadai languages spoken on the island.
Coastal varieties feature some uniquely Min vocabulary, including pronouns and negatives.
All but the Hainan dialects have complex tone sandhi systems.

Inland Min
Although they have far fewer speakers, the inland varieties show much greater variation than the coastal ones.
Pan and colleagues divided the inland varieties into two groups:
 Northern Min (Min Bei) is spoken in Nanping prefecture in Fujian, with Jian'ou dialect taken as typical.
 Central Min (Min Zhong), spoken in Sanming prefecture.
The Language Atlas of China (1987) included a further group:
 Shao-Jiang Min, spoken in the northwestern Fujian counties of Shaowu and Jiangle, were classified as Hakka by Pan and his associates. However, Jerry Norman suggested that they were inland varieties of Min that had been subject to heavy Gan or Hakka influence.

Although coastal varieties can be derived from a proto-language with four series of stops or affricates at each point of articulation (e.g. Inland varieties use pronouns and negatives cognate with those in Hakka and Yue. Inland varieties have little or no tone sandhi.

Vocabulary
Most Min vocabulary corresponds directly to cognates in other Chinese varieties, but there is also a significant number of distinctively Min words that may be traced back to proto-Min.
In some cases a semantic shift has occurred in Min or the rest of Chinese:

 *tiaŋB 鼎 "wok". The Min form preserves the original meaning "cooking pot", but in other Chinese varieties this word (MC  > dǐng) has become specialized to refer to ancient ceremonial tripods.
 *dzhənA "rice field". In Min this form has displaced the common Chinese term tián 田. Many scholars identify the Min word with chéng 塍 (MC ) "raised path between fields", but Norman argues that it is cognate with céng 層 (MC dzong) "additional layer or floor", reflecting the terraced fields commonly found in Fujian.
 *tšhioC 厝 "house". Norman argues that the Min word is cognate with shù 戍 (MC syuH) "to guard".
 *tshyiC 喙 "mouth". In Min this form has displaced the common Chinese term kǒu 口. It is believed to be cognate with huì 喙 (MC xjwojH) "beak, bill, snout; to pant".

Norman and Mei Tsu-lin have suggested an Austroasiatic origin for some Min words:

 *-dəŋA "shaman" may be compared with Vietnamese đồng (/ɗoŋ2/) "to shamanize, to communicate with spirits" and Mon doŋ "to dance (as if) under demonic possession".
 *kiɑnB 囝 "son" appears to be related to Vietnamese con (/kɔn/) and Mon kon "child".

However, Norman and Mei Tsu-lin's suggestion is rejected by Laurent Sagart (2008). Moreover, the Austroasiatic predecessor of modern Vietnamese language has been proven to originate in the mountainous region in Central Laos and Vietnam, rather than in the region north of the Red River delta.

In other cases, the origin of the Min word is obscure. Such words include:
 *khauA 骹 "foot"
 *-tsiɑmB 䭕 "insipid"
 *dzyŋC 𧚔 "to wear".

Writing system

When using Chinese characters to write a non-Mandarin form, a common practice is to use characters that correspond etymologically to the words being represented, and for words with no evident etymology, to either invent new characters or borrow characters for their sound or meaning. Written Cantonese has carried this process out to the farthest extent of any non-Mandarin variety, to the extent that pure Cantonese vernacular can be unambiguously written using Chinese characters. Contrary to popular belief, a vernacular written in this fashion is not in general comprehensible to a Mandarin speaker, due to significant changes in grammar and vocabulary and the necessary use of large number of non-Mandarin characters.

For most Min varieties, a similar process has not taken place. For Hokkien, competing systems exist. Given that Min combines the Chinese of several different periods and contains some non-Chinese substrate vocabulary, an author literate in Mandarin (or even Classical Chinese) may have trouble finding the appropriate Chinese characters for some Min vocabulary. In the case of Taiwanese, there are also indigenous words borrowed from Formosan languages (particularly for place names), as well as a substantial number of loan words from Japanese. The Min spoken in Singapore and Malaysia has borrowed heavily from Malay and, to a lesser extent, from English and other languages.  The result is that adapting Chinese characters to write Min requires a substantial effort to choose characters for a significant portion of the vocabulary.

Other approaches to writing Min rely on romanization or phonetic systems such as Taiwanese Phonetic Symbols. Some Min speakers use the Church Romanization. For Hokkien the romanization is called Pe̍h-ōe-jī (POJ) and for Fuzhou dialect called Foochow Romanized (Bàng-uâ-cê, BUC). Both systems were created by foreign missionaries in the 19th century. There are some uncommon publications that use mixed writing, with mostly Chinese characters but using the Latin alphabet to represent words that cannot easily be represented by Chinese characters.

See also 
 Chinese in New York City

References

Citations

Works cited

Further reading
 Miyake, Marc (2012). Jerry Norman's "Three Min etymologies" (1984) revisited.

 
Chinese languages in Singapore
Varieties of Chinese